Olane  is a village development committee in Panchthar District in the Province No. 1 of eastern Nepal. At the time of the 1991 Nepal census it had a population of 2381 people living in 450 individual households.

References

Populated places in Panchthar District